Julie Masse (born June 3, 1970) is a Canadian pop singer.

Biography
Masse was born in Greenfield Park, Quebec. She released her self-titled debut album in 1990, a French language album that made her a star in Quebec and France, with the singles "C'est Zéro", "Billy", "Sans t'oublier" and "Prends bien garde". Her second album, À Contre Jour, followed in 1992.

In 1993, she won the Juno Award for Best New Female Artist. She married cinematographer Sylvain Brault the same year.

In 1994, she released her debut English language album, Circle of One, on which she collaborated with Corey Hart (known for his early-1980s pop hits, such as "Sunglasses at Night"). Her relationship with Hart soon became romantic as well, and she divorced Brault in 1995.

She released a hits collection, Compilation, in 1996. She has not released another album since then, but has been a vocalist on Hart's albums and concert tours.

Hart and Masse married in 2000, and have four children together: daughters India, Dante and River, and son Rain. They now reside in The Bahamas.

Discography

Albums

Studio albums

Compilation albums

Singles

References

1970 births
Living people
Canadian expatriates in the Bahamas
French-language singers of Canada
French Quebecers
Singers from Quebec
People from Longueuil
Canadian women pop singers
Juno Award for Breakthrough Artist of the Year winners
20th-century Canadian women singers
21st-century Canadian women singers